Bastion Hill is a prominent ice-free feature in the Brown Hills of Antarctica, rising to  and projecting southward into Darwin Glacier just east of Touchdown Glacier. The descriptive name, the hill supposedly suggesting a bastion, was given by the Darwin Glacier Party of the Commonwealth Trans-Antarctic Expedition (1956–58).

References
 

Hills of Oates Land